Nertil Ferraj (born 11 September 1987) is an Albanian footballer who plays for FK Kukesi in the Albanian Superiore Division.

Club career

Dinamo Tirana
On 5 September 2014, Ferraj returned to his first club Dinamo Tirana, at that time in Albanian First Division by signing a one-year deal.

Teuta Durrës
In August 2015, Ferraj signed with Teuta Durrës of Albanian Superliga, taking the number 18 in the process. He made his debut on 22 August in team's opening match of the season, a 0–1 away win over Flamurtari Vlorë, appearing as a 67th-minute substitute for fellow debutant Eri Lamçja. During the first part of the season, Ferraj struggled to find spaces in Magani's lineup, but find it very hard as he made only seven league appearances, all of them as a substitute, and eventually left the team on 13 January of the following year by mutual consensus.

Kukësi
On 18 January 2016, Ferraj joined fellow Albanian Superliga side Kukësi by signing a deal until the end of the season. In the first leg of the quarter-final of Albanian Cup against his former club Teuta Durrës, Ferraj was an unused substitute in his team 1–0 away lose. Eight days later, Ferraj made his league debut with the club, appearing as an 81st-minute substitute in the 3–0 home win against Bylis Ballsh.

Honours

Club
Dinamo Tirana
Albanian Superliga (2): 2007–08, 2009–10

KF Tirana
Albanian Cup (1): 2011–12
Albanian Supercup (2): 2011, 2012

References

External links

1987 births
Living people
Footballers from Tirana
Albanian footballers
Association football defenders
Albania under-21 international footballers
Albania youth international footballers
FK Dinamo Tirana players
KF Tirana players
KS Kastrioti players
KF Teuta Durrës players
FK Kukësi players
FC Kamza players
FK Vora players
Kategoria Superiore players
Kategoria e Parë players